Hsu Nai-lin (born 17 September 1959) is a Taiwanese television host, actor and singer.

Career 
Hsu acted in the TV serials Deep Garden (1987), Wan-chun (1991), Qing qing he bian cao (青青河邊草, 1991) and Reaching for the Stars (2005).

He has hosted many TV shows in Taiwan, in mainland China and elsewhere. Along with co-host Sam Tseng, he won the Best Host in a Variety Programme Award at the Golden Bell Awards twice, in 2006 and 2014.

References

External links 

 

Taiwanese male television actors
Taiwanese television personalities
Living people
Place of birth missing (living people)
People from Chiayi County
21st-century Taiwanese male actors
21st-century Taiwanese male singers
20th-century Taiwanese male actors
20th-century Taiwanese male singers
1959 births